The Red Web is a 1924 Soviet silent war film shot in documentary style and directed by Ivan Kalabukhov. The film is based on the book Two Worlds by Vladimir Zazubrin. Sergei Eisenstein helped with the editing of the film. The picture was a success at the box office and was on the big screen for five years. The film is considered lost.

Plot 
One of the leaders of the guerrilla underground comes to the Siberian village Pchelino, located in the rear of the frontier of the Kolchak troops. He brings grave news to the old peasant Chepalov that his son, a partisan, died by the hands of the Whites. Chepalov's daughter, Varya, decides to continue the deceased brother's work and asks that an important task be given to her. The girl is entrusted with delivering leaflets to the guerrillas intended for distribution among the Kolchak unit. After successfully executing the assignment, Varya returns and finds the village occupied by the White Guard units. The Kolchak forces brutally crack down on peasants, demanding discharge of the partisans.

With the city's underground fighters, Varya manages to transmit weapons and illegal literature to the partisans. This gives them the opportunity to destroy the Kolchak regiment. In the city Varya meets a man who charges her with an important first task. With him she campaigns among the miners. White Guards arrest members of the clandestine meetings among whom is Varya. Those arrested are taken by ship, which is piloted by one of the underground workers ...

Cast
 Sergei Bartenev as Kosykh  
 Mikhail Lenin as Aleksandr Kolchak  
 Sergei Troitsky as General Tregubov

References

Bibliography 
 Christie, Ian & Taylor, Richard. The Film Factory: Russian and Soviet Cinema in Documents 1896-1939. Routledge, 2012.

External links 
 

1924 films
Soviet silent films
Soviet war drama films
Russian war drama films
Lost drama films
1920s war drama films
1920s Russian-language films
Lost Russian films
Biographical films about military leaders
Cultural depictions of Alexander Kolchak
Soviet black-and-white films
1924 lost films
1924 drama films
Lost Soviet films
Russian black-and-white films
Silent war drama films